Bickmarsh is a village and civil parish in the Wychavon district of Worcestershire, England.  According to the 2001 census it had a population of 65.  The village is on the Warwickshire border, and is about eight miles north-east of Evesham.

References

External links

Villages in Worcestershire
Civil parishes in Worcestershire
Wychavon